Émile Bougaud, born Edme Louis Victor Bougaud (b. at Dijon, 25 February 1823, d. at Laval, 7 November 1888) was French, known as a writer and preacher. He became Bishop of Laval.

He was an influential writer, aiming to reconcile his contemporaries with Catholic teaching.

Life

He received his classical education at Autun, where his professor of rhetoric was the Abbé Pitra. He studied theology at Dijon and Paris, was ordained priest by Monseigneur Affre in 1846, was professor of church history at the Seminary of Dijon (1846–51), and then chaplain of the Convent of the Visitation in the same city (1851–61). 

In 1861 he accepted the position of Vicar-General to Bishop Dupanloup at Orléans. In 1886, he was appointed Bishop of Laval.

Works

Besides the sermons which he delivered in Paris and other cities, Bishop Bougaud wrote numerous works. While chaplain of the Visitation Convent, he wrote Étude sur la mission, les actes et le culte de saint Bénigne and Histoire de sainte Chantal. While Vicar-General of Orléans, he wrote Histoire de sainte Monique, Histoire de la bienheureuse Marguerite Marie, Le Christianisme et les temps présents (his great apologetical work, in 5 vols.), Le grand péril de l'Église de France au XIXe siècle, and Histoire de saint Vincent de Paul (2 vols.). A volume of his discourses was published by his brother.

References

Sources
Attribution
 The entry cites
F. Lagrange, "Notice historique sur Mgr Louis-Émile Bougaud évêque de Laval", Discours de Monseigneur Bougaud évêque de Laval publiés par son frère et précédés d’une notice historique par M. l’abbé F. Lagrange Chanoine de Notre-Dame, Vicaire général d’Orléans, Paris, Poussielgue frères, 1889, p. [I]-LXX.
Semaine Religieuse de Laval (1888).

1823 births
1888 deaths
Bishops of Laval